"" ("Chosen Land"), originally titled in Spanish as "" ("Philippine National March"), and commonly and informally known by its incipit "" ("Beloved Country"), is the national anthem of the Philippines. Its music was composed in 1898 by Julián Felipe, and the lyrics were adopted from the Spanish poem "Filipinas", written by José Palma in 1899.

The composition known as "Lupang Hinirang" was commissioned on June 5, 1898, by Emilio Aguinaldo, head of the Dictatorial Government of the Philippines, as a ceremonial and instrumental national march without lyrics, similar to the status of the "Marcha Real" in Spain. It was first performed in public during the proclamation of Philippine independence at Aguinaldo's residence in Kawit, Cavite, on June 12, 1898. It was re-adopted as the national march of the Philippine Republic in 1899.

Following the defeat of the First Republic in the Philippine–American War and the subsequent colonial rule of the United States, the Flag Act of 1907 prohibited the public display of flags, banners, emblems, or devices used by the Philippine Republican Army during the war. Under the Flag Act, public performance of the national march was prohibited. Upon repeal of the Flag Act in 1919, the national march regained its popular status as the national anthem of the Philippines. Following the establishment of self-rule under the Commonwealth of the Philippines, Commonwealth Act No. 382, approved on September 5, 1938, officially adopted the musical arrangement and composition by Julián Felipe as the national anthem.

In the years after the revolution, the poem "Filipinas", written in 1899 by nationalist José Palma, gained widespread popularity as unofficial Spanish lyrics of the anthem. The Spanish lyrics were translated into English and, beginning in the 1940s, in the national language. The current Filipino lyrics, written in 1956 and with a slight revision in the 1960s, were adopted and made official. On February 12, 1998, Republic Act No. 8491 was passed, codifying these lyrics into law.

History

"Lupang Hinirang" began as incidental music which President Emilio Aguinaldo commissioned for use in the proclamation of Philippine independence from Spain. This task was given to Julián Felipe and was to replace a march which Aguinaldo had deemed unsatisfactory. The original title of this new march was "Marcha Filipina-Magdalo" (Philippine-Magdalo March), and was later changed to "Marcha Nacional Filipina" (Philippine National March) upon its adoption as the national anthem of the First Philippine Republic on June 11, 1898, a day before independence was to be proclaimed.
Felipe said that he had based his composition on three other musical pieces: the "Marcha Real", which is the current Spanish national anthem; the "Grand March" from Giuseppe Verdi's Aida; and the French national anthem, "La Marseillaise". It was played by the Banda San Francisco de Malabón (now called the Banda Matanda, from present-day General Trias) during the proclamation rites on June 12.

In August 1899, soldier and writer José Palma penned the Spanish poem Filipinas, which in turn was derived from a Kapampangan poem called Labuad Mapalad by Mariano Proceso Pabalan of Bacolor, Pampanga written in September 1898 during his stay in Casa Hacienda in Bautista, Pangasinan. The poem was published for the first time for the first anniversary of the newspaper La Independencia on September 3, 1899, and was subsequently set to the tune of the "Marcha Nacional Filipina".

The Flag Act of 1907 prohibited the use of the anthem and other Philippine revolutionary and Katipunan symbols for a short period of time. When it was repealed back in 1919, the Insular Government decided to translate the hymn from its original Spanish version to the English version. The first translation was written around that time by the renowned poet Paz Márquez Benítez of the University of the Philippines. The most popular translation, called the "Philippine Hymn", was written by Senator Camilo Osías and an American, Mary A. Lane. In the 1920s, the time signature in performance was changed from 2/4 to 4/4 to facilitate its singing and the key was changed from the original C major to G. However, this change was not codified into law. The anthem was played alongside the United States anthem, "The Star-Spangled Banner", which was adopted in 1931. It was played alongside each other until the country's eventual independence in 1946.

Tagalog translations began appearing in the 1940s, with the first known one titled "Diwa ng Bayan" (Spirit of the Country), which was sung during the Japanese occupation of the Philippines. The second most popular one was "O Sintang Lupa" (O Beloved Land) by Julián Cruz Balmaceda, Ildefonso Santos, and Francisco Caballo; this was adopted as the official version in 1948. Upon the adoption of "Diwa ng Bayan", the song "Awit sa Paglikha ng Bagong Pilipinas" and the Japanese national anthem "Kimigayo" were replaced.

During the term of President Ramon Magsaysay, Education Secretary Gregorio Hernández formed a commission to revise the lyrics. On May 26, 1956, the Tagalog translation "Lupang Hinirang" was sung for the first time. Minor revisions were made in the 1960s, and it is this version by Felipe Padilla de León which is presently used.

The Martial Law years from 1972 to 1981 during the second term of Ferdinand Marcos up to the 1986 EDSA Revolution saw the use of the National Anthem as the opening protest song of some political parties, activist organizations, and union groups, accompanied by the use of the "raised clenched fist" salute instead of the traditional hand-to-heart salute. This was notably done by opposition political parties and activists.

The 1956 Filipino lyrics were confirmed in 1958 by Republic Act No. 8491 (the "Flag and Heraldic Code of the Philippines") in 1998, abandoning use of both the Spanish and English versions. Philippine law requires that the anthem always be rendered in accordance with Felipe's original musical arrangement and composition, but the original holograph cannot be located.

Historian Ambeth Ocampo observed in 2006 that the Spanish lyrics, which were not intended to be sung when composed, do not flow with the music very well compared to later English and Tagalog versions which are smoother. Also, some of the original meanings in "Filipinas" have been lost in translation; for example, "hija del sol de oriente" in the original Spanish version became "child of the sun returning" in the Philippine Hymn and "perlas ng silanganan" in the present (official) version. In 2011, Senator Bong Revilla introduced a bill which, among other things, would have removed the requirement that the anthem be sung "in its original Filipino lyrics and march tempo", but this was not promulgated into law.

Other anthems
"Lupang Hinirang" was not the first Philippine national anthem to ever be conceived. The composer and revolutionist Julio Nakpil composed "Marangal na Dalit ng Katagalugan" (Honourable Hymn of the Tagalog Nation/People) upon the request of Andrés Bonifacio, the leader of the Katipunan, the secret society that had spearheaded the Revolution. Bonifacio had converted the organization into a revolutionary government—with himself as President—known as the Tagalog Republic just before hostilities erupted. The term "Katagalugan" in Bonifacio's usage referred to the Philippine Islands and its population as a whole; not just ethnic Tagalogs, but all Filipinos. Nakpil composed his national anthem for Bonifacio in Balara (part of modern Quezon City) in November 1896, and Bonifacio later promoted its use in Cavite, where it was still known as late as 1898. But after Bonifacio's Katipunan and Republika ng Katagalugan were superseded by a succession of various governments led by Aguinaldo starting in 1897, Nakpil's anthem was never officially adopted by them.

Some sources assert that an English version written by Mary A. Lane and Camilo Osías was legalized by Commonwealth Act No. 382. The act, however, only concerns itself with the instrumental composition by Julián Felipe.

During World War II, Felipe Padilla de León composed "Awit sa Paglikha ng Bagong Pilipinas", commissioned as a replacement anthem by the Japanese-sponsored Second Philippine Republic. It was later adapted during the martial law era under President Ferdinand Marcos into the patriotic song titled "Hymn of the New Society", not to be confused with the "March of the New Society".

Lyrics

Official lyrics
The following Spanish, English and Tagalog versions of the national anthem have been given official status throughout Philippine history. However, only the current Filipino version is officially recognized by the Flag and Heraldic Code, approved on February 12, 1998, which specifies, "The National Anthem shall always be sung in the 'national language' within or outside the country; violation of the law is punishable by a fine and imprisonment." Several bills have been introduced to amend the Flag and Heraldic Code to highlight the importance of complying, abiding and conforming to the standard expression as prescribed by law, but none have been enacted into law.

Other historical lyrics

Proposed lyrical revisions
The final line of the national anthem, "ang mamatay nang dahil sa 'yo" (literally "to die because of you [the country]" and translated above as "For us, thy sons to suffer and die."), is subject to certain proposed revisions for allegedly being defeatist. In 2013, Filipino musician Joey Ayala, tampered with the national anthem in a forum by changing the last line to "ang magmahal nang dahil sa 'yo" ("to love for the country") and arranged the time signature from 4/4 to 6/8, drawing mixed reactions from the public. In 2018, Senate President Tito Sotto suggested that last line should be revised to "ang ipaglaban ang kalayaan mo" ("to defend your freedom") as it reflects the commitment of the Filipinos to defend the country's independence, but his suggestion was not well-received by Filipino netizens.

Music and tempo 
R.A. 8491 specifies that in official or civic gatherings the anthem "shall be in accordance with the musical arrangement and composition of Julián Felipe." However, when literally followed, this would require performance by a pianist or by a brass band, as these were the only versions that were produced by Julián Felipe. The original version was composed in duple time (i.e., in a time signature of 2/4) and was changed to the present quadruple time (4/4) in the 1920s to make singing easier by reducing emphasis on syncopation.

During televised boxing matches featuring Filipino boxer Manny Pacquiao, singers have been both praised and criticized by the National Historical Institute (NHI) for singing too slow or too fast.  The NHI says that the proper tempo is a 2/4 and 100 metronomes and that the anthem should last 53 seconds.

Usage

The anthem is usually played during public gatherings in the Philippines or in foreign countries where the Filipino audience is sizable. The Code also provides that it be played at other occasions as may be allowed by the National Historical Institute (now known as the National Historical Commission of the Philippines). It prohibits its playing or singing for mere recreation, amusement, or entertainment except during International competitions where the Philippines is the host or has a representative; local competitions; during the "sign-on" and "sign-off" of radio broadcasting and television stations in the country; and before the initial and last screening of films and before the opening of theatre performances.

Until 1999, the national anthem was played with four ruffles and flourishes as the presidential salute honors music during the beginning of civil or military parades following Spanish and Taiwanese tradition, especially on national holidays. Since that year it has been played solely during the presentation of award recipients on anniversary parades or following the presidential honors.

Regulation 
Article XVI, Section 2 of the 1987 Constitution specifies that "The Congress may, by law, adopt a new name for the country, a national anthem, or a national seal, which shall be truly reflective and symbolic of the ideals, history, and traditions of the people. Such law shall take effect only upon its ratification by the people in a national referendum."

Flag and Heraldic Code of the Philippines
Republic Act No. 8491 ("The Flag and Heraldic Code of the Philippines") regulates usage of the National Anthem, and contains the complete lyrics of "Lupang Hinirang". Enacted in 1998, it requires that the anthem "shall always be sung in the national language" regardless if performed inside or outside the Philippines, and specifies that the singing must be done "with fervor".

The code specifies penalties for violation of its provisions. Section 48 provides for public censure and cancellation of licenses and permits, Section 49 requires the Department of Education and the Commission on Higher Education to ensure that all students commit the national anthem to memory, section 50 specifies penalties of fine or imprisonment for violations.

See also
 Marangal na Dalit ng Katagalugan
 Flag of the Philippines
 Oath of Allegiance (Philippines)
 Panatang Makabayan
 Pledge of Allegiance to the Philippine Flag

Notes

References

Further reading

External links

 Various versions of the Philippine National Anthem

Asian anthems
National symbols of the Philippines
National anthem compositions in F major
National anthem compositions in B-flat major
Tagalog-language songs
Philippine anthems
National anthems